Peter J. Tobin (born 1944 in Bronx, New York) is an American businessman and philanthropist who is affiliated with the Republican Party. He has a wife Mary, a son Peter, and a daughter Kristin. He graduated with his Bachelor of Business Administration at St. John's University in 1965.  Tobin was most recognized as the chief financial officer of Chase Manhattan Bank and CFO of Chemical Bank. He donated a generous amount to St. John's University, where the business school was renamed in his honor. He has led several companies through successful mergers and acquisitions and has had a very successful career.

Biography

Early life

Peter J. Tobin was born and raised in the Bronx borough of New York City by his two Irish immigrant parents. After graduating from St. Nicholas of Tolentine in the Bronx, his plan was to work during the day and attend school at night at Manhattan College. He was offered a full tuition scholarship from St. John's University through his local parish and decided to attend school there. He was unsure at the time about a field of study but a quick influence by one of his professors made him enroll as an accounting major in the College of Business Administration. Tobin graduated with a bachelor's degree from St. John's University in 1965. In 1966, Tobin married Mary Gamble of the Bronx, who he met at a dance in Yonkers and felt instantly in love.

Corporate life 

After graduating from St. John's University in 1965, Tobin brought the school's Vincentian values to the corporate world. He began his career at Peat, Marwick, Mitchell & Company, where he stayed until 1972 when he moved to Manufacturers Hanover Trust Branch Bank.  There, he quickly moved up the corporate ladder, making it to senior Vice President by 1981, and named the CFO in 1985.

In 1991, Manufacturers Hanover Trust Branch Bank merged with Chemical Bank, and he remained the CFO. Five years later, Tobin played a pivotal role in the purchase of Chase Manhattan Bank. It was decided to drop the name Chemical Bank because Chase was better known around the world. At Chase, he remained the CFO for one year and then retired.

After his retirement in 1997, he became one of the most sought after banking professionals in the world. He became a dean at St. John's University, and continued his business role by serving on multiple corporate boards.

St. John’s University 

In 1998 Tobin assumed the deanship at the College of Business at St. John's.  During his time there he added 13 new programs, hired new faculty and renewed AACSB accreditation by the Internal Association for Management Education.

In 1999, Tobin and his wife Mary made a substantial donation of $10.25 million to St. John's University.  The business school was then renamed to Peter J. Tobin College of Business for his generosity.  This was the largest donation in the school's 129-year history.  He was honored with the Spirit of Service Award and the honorary degree of Doctor of Commercial Science.  He was also awarded the highest award that can be given to alumni, the Medal of Honor in 2000 by Donald J. Harrington, President of St. John's University.

Current 

Tobin continues to be active in the business community, philanthropy. He has been a director at AllianceBernstein since 2000, AXA Financial since 1999, and CIT Group since 2002. In addition to being on these boards Tobin is a member of the New York City Independent Budget Office Advisory Board and on the board of the H.W. Wilson Company.

References

External links
 The Tobin Story
 St. John's University | Catholic, Vincentian, Metropolitan, Global
 

Living people
Place of birth missing (living people)
American philanthropists
St. John's University (New York City) alumni
American people of Irish descent
1943 births
American chief financial officers
New York (state) Republicans